James Joseph Woolley (September 26, 1966 – August 14, 2016) was an American keyboard and synthesizer player, best known for performing with industrial rock band Nine Inch Nails during the 1991 Lollapalooza Tour and the beginning part of the 1994 Self Destruct Tour. Woolley also appeared in the videos for "Wish" and "March of the Pigs", as well as parts of the Nine Inch Nails release Closure (1997). Woolley won a Grammy Award in 1993 for "Best Metal Performance" for "Wish".

Prior to Nine Inch Nails, Woolley was a major collaborator along with former NIN drummer Chris Vrenna to Chicago band Die Warzau. In 1994, just before NIN hit the road, Woolley contributed to Sister Machine Gun's album, The Torture Technique.

Subsequent to Nine Inch Nails, Woolley made contributions to Die Warzau albums again, particularly 2005's Convenience. In 1998, Woolley toured with Rob Halford's one-time band 2wo, which also included John 5 of Marilyn Manson. After 2wo, Woolley did some studio audio work in Los Angeles. After 2006, he was involved with V.O.I.D., whose debut album was released in 2009, after his relocation to Chicago in June 2008. The band was led by Woolley and featured Jon Roberts, Mark Pearlman, and DJ Aaron Chase.

Woolley last resided in Round Lake Beach, Illinois, and had a studio near Lake Forest, Illinois. Woolley died on August 14, 2016 at the age of 49. His ex-wife Kate Van Buren revealed that Woolley had been living with "significant neck and spine injuries" which later contributed to his death.

References

1966 births
2016 deaths
American industrial musicians
20th-century American keyboardists
Nine Inch Nails members
Grammy Award winners